Earl of Lothian may refer to:

 Earl of Dunbar, a title which existed between the early 12th century and the early 15th century
 Marquess of Lothian, peerages created in 1606 and 1631

Lothian
Lothian